Lenora Isabella Crichlow (born 4 January 1985) is a British actress. She became known for her starring roles as Maria "Sugar" Sweet in the Channel 4 comedy-drama series Sugar Rush, Annie Sawyer in the BBC Three supernatural drama series Being Human, and Shania Andrews in the 2012 sports drama film Fast Girls. In 2013, Crichlow portrayed Chen Sam in the television film Burton & Taylor and Victoria Skillane in the episode "White Bear" of the dystopian sci-fi series, Black Mirror. She has since had regular roles in the ABC sitcom Back in the Game and the NBC comedy series A to Z. Since 2020 she has been part of the main cast of the HBO/Sky One comedy series Avenue 5 playing second engineer Billie McEvoy.

Early life
Crichlow was born and raised in Harlesden, London to Frank Crichlow and Lucy Addington. Her father, who was born in Port of Spain, Trinidad and Tobago, owned the Mangrove restaurant in Notting Hill, which was frequented by stars such as Jimi Hendrix and Vanessa Redgrave. Crichlow has two sisters, Amandla and Francesca, and a brother, Knowlton. Her younger sister, Amandla, is also an actress who appeared in Prime Suspect: The Final Act and The Bill.

From the age of twelve, Crichlow trained and worked with the Young Blood Theatre Company in Hammersmith, West London. She went on to study drama at the University of Sussex.

Career
Crichlow's first professional acting role came when she was cast alongside Billie Piper in the television film Bella and the Boys. She made her first feature film appearance in the low-budget horror film Wilderness, released in 2006, and her first television appearance in the ITV police drama series The Bill. Crichlow came to public prominence starring as Maria "Sugar" Sweet in Channel 4's adaptation of the Julie Burchill novel Sugar Rush, which won the 2006 International Emmy Award in the Children And Young People category.

In 2007, she appeared in the Doctor Who episode "Gridlock", guest starring as Cheen. Crichlow then had a role in BBC One's feature-length drama Kiss of Death in 2008, starring alongside Danny Dyer. In March 2010, Crichlow returned to the world of Doctor Who in the audio release of The Architects of History, playing a new character, Rachel Cooper, a companion of the Seventh Doctor in an alternate timeline. Crichlow then played the role of Portia in a performance of William Shakespeare's The Merchant of Venice, for the BBC's educational platform Bitesize.

In November 2008, the BBC announced Crichlow had been cast as Annie Sawyer, a ghost in a flat shared with a vampire and a werewolf, in the BBC Three series Being Human, replacing Andrea Riseborough who had played the character in the pilot. In 2011, Crichlow won the TV Actress of the Year Award at the annual Glamour Awards for her work on the show. She continued to play the role of Annie in the programme until deciding to depart following the last episode of the fourth series, which aired in March 2012. Crichlow later narrated the audiobook of Simon Guerrier's tie-in novel The Road.

In November 2009, Crichlow played the part of Alice Jackson in Collision, an ITV1 drama which ran over five consecutive nights. From January to February 2010, Crichlow appeared as aspiring fashion designer Ali Redcliffe in the BBC One romantic comedy miniseries Material Girl. In June 2010, she also played the role of Ashley in a BBC Three pilot, Dappers. That same month, Crichlow presented Nelson Mandela: One Incredible Life on BBC Three. For the documentary, Crichlow travelled to South Africa to learn more about Nelson Mandela's story. In 2011, Crichlow played the character of Police Sergeant Lily Thomson in the BBC drama Death in Paradise.

In January 2011, Crichlow appeared in six short accompaniments for The Tudors airings on BBC America. Crichlow also narrated The Gatwick Baby: Abandoned at Birth, shown on BBC Three on 13 April 2011. The following year, she appeared in an episode of Inspector George Gently, and played the central role of Shania Andrews, a streetwise 200m runner, in the Olympics-themed drama film Fast Girls. In December 2012, she starred as Laura Stanton in the ITV1 drama film Doors Open, an adaptation of the Ian Rankin novel of the same name.

In February 2013, Crichlow starred as Victoria Skillane in "White Bear", the second episode in the second series of Charlie Brooker's critically acclaimed anthology series Black Mirror. The following month, it was announced that she had landed a main role in the American sitcom Back in the Game for the ABC network, starring alongside James Caan and Maggie Lawson. In July 2013, Crichlow portrayed the role of Chen Sam in the BBC Four television film Burton & Taylor, alongside Helena Bonham Carter and Dominic West.

In 2014, she portrayed Mel in the independent drama film Electricity, starring opposite Agyness Deyn and Christian Cooke. In February 2014, it was announced that Crichlow had been cast as Stephie Bennett in the NBC comedy series A to Z. The series was given a full season order, but was ultimately cancelled. She next appeared in the Kevin Pollak-directed comedy-drama The Late Bloomer, alongside J. K. Simmons, Brittany Snow, and Johnny Simmons. Crichlow was then cast as Dina Clark in the ABC procedural crime drama series Deception, alongside Jack Cutmore-Scott and Amaury Nolasco.

Filmography

Film

Television

Other work

Theatre

Radio

Awards and nominations

References

External links
 
 

1985 births
21st-century English actresses
Actresses from London
Black British actresses
English film actresses
English people of Trinidad and Tobago descent
English stage actresses
English television actresses
Living people
People from Harlesden
People from Westminster